The 1955 All-Big Seven Conference football team consists of American football players chosen by various organizations for All-Big Seven Conference teams for the 1955 college football season.  The selectors for the 1955 season included the Associated Press (AP) and the United Press (UP).  Players selected as first-team players by both the AP and UP are designated in bold.

All-Big Seven selections

Backs
 Tommy McDonald, Oklahoma (AP-1 [HB]; UP-1 [HB]) (College and Pro Football Halls of Fame)
 Doug Roether, Kansas St. (AP-1; UP-1 [FB])
 Bob Burris, Oklahoma (AP-1 [HB])
 Rex Fisher, Nebraska (AP-1)
 Jimmy Harris, Oklahoma (UP-1 [QB])
 Willie Greenlaw, Nebraska (UP-1 [HB])

Ends
 Hank Burnine, Missouri (AP-1; UP-1)
 Lamar Myer, Colorado (AP-1)
 Jon McWilliams, Nebraska (UP-1)

Tackles
 Ed Gray, Oklahoma (AP-1; UP-1)
 Laverne Torczon, Nebraska (AP-1)
 Sam Salerno, Colorado (UP-1)

Guards
 Bo Bolinger, Oklahoma (AP-1; UP-1)
 Cecil Morris, Oklahoma (AP-1; UP-1)

Centers
 Jerry Tubbs, Oklahoma (AP-1; UP-1)

Key
AP = Associated Press

UP = United Press

See also
1955 College Football All-America Team

References

All-Big Seven Conference football team
All-Big Eight Conference football teams